Emma Township is a township in Harvey County, Kansas, United States.  As of the 2000 census, its population was 4,181.

Geography
According to the USGS, it contains one cemetery, Church of God.

Transportation
Emma Township contains one airport or landing strip, Weaver Ranch Airport.

References

Further reading

External links
 Harvey County Website
 City-Data.com
 Harvey County Maps: Current, Historic, KDOT

Townships in Harvey County, Kansas
Townships in Kansas